Jazzy Danziger (born 1984) is an American poet and editor.

Life and career
Danziger was born in St. Louis, Missouri and raised in Maitland, Florida. She earned her bachelor's degree from Washington University in St. Louis and her MFA in Poetry from the University of Virginia, where she was Editor in Chief of Meridian. She has served as series editor for the annual Best New Poets anthology since 2011.

Books
As author:
Darkroom (University of Wisconsin Press, 2012)

As editor:
Best New Poets 2015 (Samovar/University of Virginia Press, 2015) with guest editor Tracy K. Smith
Best New Poets 2014 (Samovar/University of Virginia Press, 2014) with guest editor Dorianne Laux
Best New Poets 2013 (Samovar/University of Virginia Press, 2013) with guest editor Brenda Shaughnessy
Best New Poets 2012 (Samovar/University of Virginia Press, 2012) with guest editor Matthew Dickman
Best New Poets 2011 (Samovar/University of Virginia Press, 2011) with guest editor D. A. Powell

Anthology publications:
Two Weeks: A Digital Anthology of Contemporary Poetry (Linebreak, 2011)

Awards
Brittingham Prize in Poetry (Judge: Jean Valentine) (2012) 
From the University of Virginia: 
Henry Hoyns/Poe-Faulkner Fellowship (2008–2010)
From Washington University in St. Louis:
Academy of American Poets Prize (Judge: Bin Ramke) (2006)
Academy of American Poets Prize Honorable Mention (Judge: Thomas Sayers Ellis) (2007)
Roger Conant Hatch Prize for Poetry (2006 and 2007)
Norma Lowry Memorial Fund Prize for Poetry (2007)
Andrea Goff Memorial Prize for Poetry (2007)
Julia Viola McNeely Memorial Prize for Poetry (2006 and 2007)

References

1984 births
Writers from Orlando, Florida
Writers from St. Louis
Living people
American women poets
People from Maitland, Florida
21st-century American poets
21st-century American women writers
Trinity Preparatory School alumni
Washington University in St. Louis alumni
University of Virginia alumni